David Chávez Jr. (November 12, 1897 – November 3, 1984) was an American attorney and jurist who served as a judge on the United States District Court for the District of Puerto Rico from 1947 to 1950, and as a justice of the New Mexico Supreme Court from 1960 to 1968.

Early life and education 
Chávez was born in Los Chaves in Valencia County and grew up in Albuquerque, New Mexico. He served in the United States Army during World War I. He earned a Bachelor of Arts degree from the University of New Mexico and a Juris Doctor from the Georgetown University Law Center.

Career 
Chávez served as mayor of Santa Fe from 1932 to 1934. From 1936 to 1942 he was a District Judge at the First Judicial District in Santa Fe.  Chávez briefly resigned to serve in the U.S. Army during World War II and returned to the bench after the war. He served in the Army’s Judge Advocate General Corps and participated in the prosecution of 40 Dachau concentration camp guards. The U.S. Army awarded Colonel Chavez a bronze star medal for his service prosecuting Nazi war criminals. He was appointed to the judgeship of the Puerto Rico District by President Harry S. Truman and served from 1947 to 1950. He returned to New Mexico in 1950 to run unsuccessfully for Governor. He worked in private practice in Santa Fe until Governor Burroughs appointed him to the New Mexico Supreme Court in 1959.  Chávez served on the New Mexico Supreme Court from 1960 until 1968.

Personal life 
He was the brother of United States Senator Dennis Chávez. He died in Las Vegas, New Mexico.

References

Guillermo A. Baralt, History of the Federal Court in Puerto Rico: 1899-1999 (2004) (also published in Spanish as Historia del Tribunal Federal de Puerto Rico)

Judges of the United States District Court for the District of Puerto Rico
United States Article I federal judges appointed by Harry S. Truman
20th-century American judges
Justices of the New Mexico Supreme Court
Mayors of Santa Fe, New Mexico
1897 births
1984 deaths
Politicians from Albuquerque, New Mexico
University of New Mexico alumni
Georgetown University Law Center alumni
Military personnel from New Mexico
Hispanic and Latino American judges
Hispanic and Latino American mayors
Judge Advocates General of the United States Army